Tupiocoris notatus is a sap-sucking bug in the family of Miridae. It feeds on mesophyll cell contents of solanaceous plants like Datura and Nicotiana-species. The insect is about 2 – 3 mm long and, like all hemipterans, undergoes an incomplete metamorphosis with several nymph stages.

It is distributet mainly in the southern continental US and Mexico but also the Caribbean, Middle- and South America. 
This organism is used in research as a model organism in the field of chemical ecology to study plant-herbivore interactions between this insect and plants like Datura wrightii or the model plant Nicotiana attenuata.

References

Insects described in 1893
Taxa named by William Lucas Distant
Dicyphini